Robsonius is a genus of passerine birds in the family Locustellidae.  The genus was introduced by the English ornithologist Nigel J. Collar in 2006 with the Cordillera ground warbler (Robsonius rabori) as the type species. The name was chosen to honour the British ornithologist Craig R. Robson.

The genus contains the following species:

 Cordillera ground warbler (Robsonius rabori)
 Sierra Madre ground warbler (Robsonius thompsoni)
 Bicol ground warbler (Robsonius sorsogonensis)

References

Collar, N. J. & Robson, C. 2007. Family Timaliidae (Babblers)  pp. 70 – 291 in; del Hoyo, J., Elliott, A. & Christie, D.A. eds. Handbook of the Birds of the World, Vol. 12. Picathartes to Tits and Chickadees. Lynx Edicions, Barcelona.

 
Bird genera